The Silk Road Race is a charity rally from Milan to the capital of Tajikistan, Dushanbe. The Silk Road Race is organised by Partenza Intelligente, a non-profit cultural association based in Lainate (Milan) Italy. The first edition of the rally was launched 31 July 2010.

Adventure 
The Silk Road Race typically launches from Villa Litta Visconti Borromeo, a historic palace of the 16th century in Lainate near Milan, Italy, in the last week of July. The teams participate at the Start Night launch event with many people and a rock concert during the launching procedure. The teams can participate to the rally with any motor-based vehicle, there is no limit based on engine displacement or vehicle type.

Routes 
The main routes to Tajikistan are typically three. The northern route, from Milan to Tajikistan via east Europe: Ukraine, Russia, Kazakhstan, and Uzbekistan; the middle route: Turkey, Georgia, Azerbaijan and then crossing the Caspian Sea to Turkmenistan; or the south route: Turkey, Iran, Turkmenistan, Uzbekistan, and then Tajikistan.  However the route is totally free, teams can choose their own route to Tajikistan but they must arrive at Dushanbe in 3 weeks to join the finish party.
The Silk Road Race is approximately 8.000 km long.

Entry fees 
The Silk Road Race charges an entry fee that is aimed at covering the costs of running the event. All funds that are generated from charity fees are donated to a project started by Cesvi that provide water and sanitation in the south region of Tajikistan.  The Silk Road Race 2012 entry fee for a car or a truck team was €499 and €250 for a motorcycle. A team is composed by a single vehicle: a car/truck or a motorcycle. The Silk Road Race 2012 minimum charity fee for cars/trucks teams was €950 and €300 for a motorcycle team.

See also
Mongol Rally

References

External links 
  CESVI Description of the Silk Road Race Milano-Dushanbe charity rally
 Silk Road Race official site

Press coverage of the Silk Road Race Milano-Dushanbe charity rally 
 Silk Road Race 2011 edition - Gazzetta dello Sport
  Silk Road Race 2010 edition - Corriere della Sera Viaggi
  Silk Road Race 2010 edition - Repubblica Viaggi
  Silk Road Race 2012 edition - Turisti per Caso

Automotive events
Rally raid races
Road rallying
Cross-border races